Rufus of Thebes (also Roufos) is numbered among the Seventy Disciples in Eastern Orthodox tradition. He was bishop of Thebes in Greece, and according to some traditions is referenced in Romans 16:13.  His feast day is April 8. However, according to Easton's Bible Dictionary the Rufus in Romans 16 could well have been the Rufus mentioned in Mark.

Hymns
Troparion (Tone 1)   
Let us praise in hymns the six–fold choir of Apostles:
Herodion and Agabus,
Rufus, Asyncritus, Phlegon and holy Hermes.
They ever entreat the Trinity for our souls!

Kontakion (Tone 2)
You became the disciples of Christ
And all-holy Apostles,
O glorious Herodion, Agabus and Rufus,
Asyncritus, Phlegon and Hermes.
Ever entreat the Lord
To grant forgiveness of transgressions
To us who sing your praises.

Kontakion (Tone 4)
Like stars, O holy Apostles,
You illumine the way of the faithful with the light of the Holy Spirit.
You dispel the darkness of error as you gaze on God the Word!

Sources 
St. Nikolai Velimirovic, The Prologue from Ohrid

External links
Apostle Rufus of the Seventy and those with him (OCA)
Agavos, Rouphos, Asynkritos, Phlegon, Herodion, & Hermes of the 70 Apostles (GOARCH)
The Holy Apostles Herodian, Agabus, Rufus, Asyncritus, Phlegon and Hermes (Prologue from Ohrid)

References

Seventy disciples
Christian saints from the New Testament
1st-century bishops in Roman Achaea
Saints of Roman Achaia
Bishops of Thebes, Greece